Garston could refer to several places:

England
Garston, Hertfordshire
Garston railway station (Hertfordshire)
Garston, Liverpool, Merseyside
Garston railway station (Merseyside)

New Zealand
Garston, New Zealand, town in the Southland District